Linda Molin (born 6 May 1992) is a Swedish footballer who played for Umeå IK.

External links 
 

1992 births
Living people
Swedish women's footballers
Umeå IK players
Damallsvenskan players
Women's association football midfielders